Year End Sensation was a series of touring events produced by Frontier Martial-Arts Wrestling (FMW) taking place annually in the month of December. The intent of the series was to conclude the storylines by the end of the year and head into the new year. The event started in 1993 as a supercard titled Year End Spectacular and then the event was incorporated into a tour after FMW began producing wrestling series in 1995. The event was renamed Year End Sensation and continued as a tour until 2000. The last event promoted as Year End Spectacular took place in 1996. It was considered one of the FMW's four big supercards of the year, along with FMW Anniversary Show, Summer Spectacular and Fall Spectacular before FMW began producing pay-per-view events in 1998.

Dates and venues

References